Dher Umid Ali Shah is a village and a union council, an administrative subdivision, and one of the 28 unions of the Mianwali District in the Punjab province of Pakistan. It is located in Mianwali tehsil at 32°49'59N 71°34'28E.

References

Union councils of Mianwali District